The bibliography of Kurt Vonnegut (1922–2007) includes essays, books and fiction, as well as film and television adaptations of works written by the Indianapolis-born author. Vonnegut began his literary career with science fiction short stories and novels, but abandoned the genre to focus on political writings and painting in his later life.

Novels

Collections

Plays

Short stories

Articles

Interviews

Other works

Library of America Collection

Film and television adaptations

References

Further reading

External links
Vonnegut's archive at In These Times

 
Bibliographies of American writers
Bibliographies by writer
Postmodern literature bibliographies
Science fiction bibliographies